Buena Vista Social Club: Adios is a 2017 documentary film directed by Lucy Walker. It is a follow up to the 1999 documentary Buena Vista Social Club about Cuban music. The film was released in theaters on May 26, 2017.

Synopsis

Buena Vista Social Club: Adios takes place sixteen years after the 1999 documentary Buena Vista Social Club. It follows the five original band members from the first film as they go on one final tour that ends in their hometown of Havana, Cuba. The musicians recall their ups and downs over the years, including award-winning performances and losing many of their fellow band members.

References

External links
 
 

2017 films
American documentary films
British documentary films
Cuban documentary films
Documentary films about music and musicians
Documentary films about Cuba
Buena Vista Social Club
Broad Green Pictures films
Films shot in Cuba
2010s English-language films
2010s American films
2010s British films